Hercules Anthony Vollugi (15 June 1880 – 11 October 1960) was an Australian rules footballer who played with Essendon in the Victorian Football League (VFL).

Vollugi was a wingman in Essendon's 1901 premiership team, which came in his first league season. He also played in the 1902 VFL Grand Final, which Essendon lost.

He later served Essendon as a committeeman.

Vollugi was also a first-grade cricketer for East Melbourne, and a golfer. He became secretary of Elsternwick Golf Club.

References

External links

 
 

1880 births
Australian rules footballers from Melbourne
Essendon Football Club players
Essendon Football Club Premiership players
1960 deaths
One-time VFL/AFL Premiership players
People from Carlton, Victoria